Li Na was the defending champion, but lost the final against Victoria Azarenka, 6–2, 1–6, 6–3.

Seeds
The top two seeds received a bye into the second round.

Draw

Finals

Top half

Bottom half

Qualifying

Seeds

Qualifiers

Lucky losers

Qualifying draw

First qualifier

Second qualifier

Third qualifier

Fourth qualifier

Fifth qualifier

Sixth qualifier

References
Main Draw
Qualifying Draw

Women's Singles
2012 WTA Tour